Stendal Nuclear Power Station  is a nuclear power station which was never completed.  It was located in East Germany, near the city of Arneburg, Stendal in Bezirk Magdeburg, today's Saxony-Anhalt.

History
The power station was planned to become the largest nuclear power station of East Germany – also the largest nuclear power station in all of Germany. However, after German reunification the safety of the Soviet design was questioned, and all plans for operation and further construction were halted.

Altogether, it was planned to house four reactors at the site of the VVER-1000/320 type, which were some of the most modern and largest units of its time with 1000 MWe. Construction of unit 1 and 2 began in 1983 and units 3 and 4 remained in planning. Unit 1 was about 85% finished and unit 2 was about 15% finished.

The above-ground connecting building between all units has been knocked down. The emergency diesel generators for unit 1 were completed and still stand almost entirely intact.

It was planned to have two cooling towers per reactor, as was typical with such Soviet designs. The turbine house was connected to the reactor buildings and each reactor had its own turbine and cooling towers in the designs. Several operating plants today have such a design, notably the Temelin Nuclear Power Plant in the Czech Republic.

An innovation for the Stendal plant was that the reactor pressure vessel (RPV) plans were modified heavily by the company SKET in Magdeburg in connection with the planning office in Moscow.  It was to be constructed with a new steel cell composite technique, which differed from other similar plants. This RPV was produced, but was then divided and scrapped in 1990/1991 in the course of the site deconstruction.

Through the German reunification, the construction was stopped and the three completed cooling towers were demolished in 1994 and 1999 with explosives.

The area is an industrial estate today.

See also

Nuclear plants built in the former East Germany
Greifswald Nuclear Power Plant
Rheinsberg Nuclear Power Plant

References

Former nuclear power stations in Germany
East Germany–Soviet Union relations
Nuclear power stations using VVER reactors
Unfinished nuclear reactors
Buildings and structures in Stendal (district)